Bayan is a village located in Bayan Subdistrict in North Lombok, Indonesia.

Administration 
Bayan is divided into 13 Dusun or fifth-level-government in Indonesia:

Batu Jompang
Bayan Timur
Bayan Barat
Bual
Dasan Tutul
Karang Salah
Mandala
Montong Baru
Nangka Rempek
Pada Mangko
Sembulan
Teres Genit
Ujung Mekar

Tourism 
Bayan is one of the centers of Wetu Telu, in this village there are many traditions, architecture and social culture of the Sasak people. One of them is an event, Adat malid is a tradition in Bayan and surrounding villages which is held for 2 days. Place of oldest mosque at Lombok Bayan Beleq Mosque.

Gallery

References

Villages in West Nusa Tenggara